The 37th World Artistic Gymnastics Championships were held in Anaheim, California, United States, from 16 to 24 August 2003.

Tie-breakers were not used at this competition. If two gymnasts received identical scores in the event finals, they were both awarded medals for their placement.

Medalists

Men

Qualification

Team

All-around

Floor exercise

Pommel horse

Rings

Vault

Parallel bars

Horizontal bar

Women

Qualification

Team 

Note: Annia Hatch and Ashley Postell were originally named to the US team, but both withdrew from the competition due to a knee injury (Hatch) and a severe case of the flu (Postell). Chellsie Memmel and Terin Humphrey were flown in as alternates to replace them. After a successful performance in the qualification round, Courtney Kupets severely injured her Achilles tendon and the US was then down to 5 athletes, as it was too late to call in their third alternate (Samantha Sheehan) after competition had already begun.

All-around

Vault

Uneven bars

Balance beam

Floor exercise 

Daiane dos Santos became the first Brazilian female world champion in gymnastics.

Medal count

Overall

Men

Women

References 

 
World Artistic Gymnastics Championships
W
Artistic World 2003
G
2003 in sports in California
International sports competitions in California